Luther Hartwell Hodges (March 9, 1898October 6, 1974) was a businessman and American politician. After a career in textile manufacturing, he entered public service, gaining some state appointments. Elected as lieutenant governor of North Carolina in 1952, he succeeded to the Governor's office in 1954 after the death of the incumbent. He was elected in 1956 to a full four-year term, serving in total as the 64th governor of the state of North Carolina from 1954 to 1961.

In 1961 he was appointed as United States Secretary of Commerce under Presidents John F. Kennedy and Lyndon B. Johnson, serving until 1965. He returned to North Carolina and served as chairman of Research Triangle Park, a major facility established during his tenure as governor.

Biography
Hodges was born in Cascade, Pittsylvania County, Virginia, on March 9, 1898. At the age of two, he moved with his family to Spray (which later merged with two other towns to become Eden, North Carolina). After growing up there, he lived much of his life in Rockingham County, North Carolina.

Hodges left for the University of North Carolina at Chapel Hill at age 17, where he was a member of the Dialectic and Philanthropic Societies, and moved back to Eden after graduation. He went to work at Carolina Cotton and Woolen Mills in Leaksville. In 1923, he helped form the Leaksville Rotary Club, which later became known as the Eden Rotary.

Carolina Cotton was later purchased by Marshall Field. Hodges continued to work for the company, working his way up from millworker to executive positions, until he retired to enter politics. In the 1940s, he gained gubernatorial appointments to the state Board of Education and the Highway and Public Works Commission. In 1945, he served as a consultant to the U.S. Secretary of Agriculture and to the U.S. Army in occupied Germany. He retired in 1950 and returned to North Carolina.

Hodges ran for office as lieutenant governor in 1952 and was elected. He succeeded to the position of governor in November 1954 upon the death of Governor William B. Umstead in office.

Two years later, Hodges was elected on his own account to a full four-year term as governor. Because North Carolina had a one-term limit for governors at that time, Hodges had the longest continuous tenure in the office until the state constitution was changed and Jim Hunt was elected to a second term in 1980.

During his time in office, Governor Hodges promoted industrialization and education.
He helped gain support for the establishment of Research Triangle Park, intended to attract innovation and industry to the North Carolina Piedmont, and to strengthen connections among the three universities involved. After Hodges completed his tenure in 1965 as Secretary of the Department of Commerce, he returned to Chapel Hill. He was appointed as Chairman of Research Triangle Park. In 1967, he served a one-year term as president of Rotary International.

Civil rights
In 1959, Hodges became involved in the Kissing Case, where two young African-American boys (one aged 9, and one aged 7) had been convicted of rape because a white girl (aged 8) had kissed them each on the cheek. They had been sentenced to the state reformatory. A range of activists, civil rights organizations, Eleanor Roosevelt and President Eisenhower, in addition to the international press, pressured Hodges for clemency. After three months Hodges pardoned them, but refused to apologize.  Former First Lady Eleanor Roosevelt "led an international campaign on their behalf."

Later years
He died on October 6, 1974, in Chapel Hill, North Carolina, and is buried at the Overlook Cemetery in Eden, North Carolina.  A monument was erected in his honor near a water fountain in Eden's Freedom Park.

Legacy
Hodges's son, Luther H. Hodges Jr., was a prominent banking executive and United States Deputy Secretary of Commerce.

See also
 List of members of the American Legion

References

|-

|-

|-

|-

1898 births
1974 deaths
People from Pittsylvania County, Virginia
Democratic Party governors of North Carolina
Hodges family
Kennedy administration cabinet members
20th-century American politicians
Lieutenant Governors of North Carolina
Lyndon B. Johnson administration cabinet members
University of North Carolina at Chapel Hill alumni
United States Secretaries of Commerce
1956 United States vice-presidential candidates
United States Army civilians
People from Eden, North Carolina
Military personnel from North Carolina
American United Methodists
Rotary International leaders